Falla N'Doye (born March 4, 1960) is a football referee from Senegal. He is known for refereeing one match during the 2002 FIFA World Cup. He has also been involved in the CAF Nations Cup, CAF Super Cup and FIFA Club World Cup.

References

1960 births
Living people
Senegalese football referees
FIFA World Cup referees
2002 FIFA World Cup referees
Olympic football referees